Gao Diping (born October 17, 1991), better known as Gogoing, is a Chinese retired professional League of Legends player. He is a notable player of the "Top Lane" position, renowned for his Garen (a character of League of Legends) play. He has had high achievements both in the Chinese league as well as internationally. Gao, in his prime, has been considered by many analysts and other players in the League of Legends scene as one of the most mechanically skillful players and top top lane players, particularly in 2014. Gao retired in 2015.

In August 2016, Gogoing announced the formation of a new team, Go Dream, but he would serve as the manager and not a player.

Tournament results

OMG
 5–8th — 2013 League of Legends World Championship
 1st — 2013 LPL Spring
 2rd — 2013 LPL Summer
 2nd — 2013 WCG Grand Prix
 3rd — 2014 LPL Spring
 2nd — 2014 LPL Summer 
 3–4th — 2014 League of Legends World Championship
 5–8th — 2015 LPL Spring
 7th — 2015 LPL Summer

References

Living people
Chinese esports players
OMG (esports) players
League of Legends top lane players
1991 births